The 2018 Coral UK Open was a darts tournament staged by the Professional Darts Corporation. It was the sixteenth year of the tournament where, following numerous regional qualifying heats throughout Britain, players competed in a single elimination tournament to be crowned champion. The tournament was held for the fifth time at the Butlin's Resort in Minehead, England, between 2–4 March 2018, and has the nickname, "the FA Cup of darts" as a random draw was staged after each round until the final.

Peter Wright was the defending champion after defeating Gerwyn Price 11–6 in the 2017 final, but he lost in the third round to Nathan Rafferty.

Gary Anderson became the UK Open champion for the first time, defeating Corey Cadby (who was making his debut in the event) 11–7 in the final.

Michael van Gerwen's defeat to Jeffrey de Zwaan in the third round was the first time van Gerwen had lost a live match on ITV since the 2014 Players Championship Finals. Van Gerwen was unbeaten for 77 live matches (including the two live World Series events) on the channel during that period.

The tournament was severely affected by the extreme weather conditions caused by Storm Emma which had forced the complete cancellation of round five of the 2018 Premier League Darts that had been due to be held in Exeter the evening before the tournament started. Eleven players who were due to play in the first, second and third rounds withdrew from the competition, and on 2 March, the unprecedented decision was taken by Butlin's to not allow any fans apart from the players relatives, guests and friends into the venue, resulting in the whole tournament being played behind closed doors.

The tournament was still televised live on ITV4, but the Butlin's Skyline Pavilion Arena was unable to be used for the allocated Main Stage TV matches due to heavy snow and ice, so these matches were reallocated to the secondary Red's Bar stage.

Format and qualifiers

UK Open qualifiers
There were six qualifying events staged in February 2018 to determine the UK Open Order of Merit Table. The tournament winners were:

The tournament is featuring 128 players. The results of the six qualifiers shown above will be collated into the UK Open Order Of Merit. The top 32 players in the Order of Merit receive a place at the final tournament. In addition, the next 64 players (without ties in this year's edition) in the Order of Merit list qualify for the tournament, but start in the earlier rounds played on the Friday. A further 32 players qualify via regional qualifying tournaments.

Top 32 in Order of Merit (receiving byes into third round)

Number 33–64 of the Order of Merit (receiving byes into second round)

Number 65–96 of the Order of Merit qualifiers (starting in first round)

** René Berndt dropped out of the tournament because of health reasons.

Rileys qualifiers (starting in first round)
32 amateur players qualified from 28 Rileys Sports Bar qualifiers held across the UK between 20 January and 18 February.

* Due to Storm Emma, multiple players pulled out of the tournament.

Prize money
The prize fund stayed the same as last year, £350,000.

Draw
(Note: Due to extreme weather all matches in the tournament were played behind closed doors)

Friday 2 March

First round (best of eleven legs)

** René Berndt withdrew from the tournament because of health reasons.

Second round (best of eleven legs)

* Due to extreme weather, multiple players pulled out of the tournament.

Third round (best of nineteen legs)

* Lerchbacher was the only third-round qualifier to withdraw from the tournament due to the weather conditions, so Hughes received a bye to the fourth round.

Saturday 3 March

Fourth round (best of nineteen legs)

Fifth round (best of nineteen legs)

Sunday 4 March

Quarter-finals (best of nineteen legs)

Semi-finals and Final (best of twenty-one legs)

References

UK Open
UK Open
UK Open
UK Open